John Taylor, nicknamed "Red", was a Negro league pitcher in the 1920s.

Taylor made his Negro leagues debut in 1920 with the Chicago Giants, and played for Chicago again the following season. He finished his career with the Lincoln Giants in 1924 and 1925.

References

External links
 and Seamheads

Place of birth missing
Place of death missing
Year of birth missing
Year of death missing
Chicago Giants players
Lincoln Giants players